Lasasaurus is an extinct genus of procolophonid parareptile known from the Early Triassic Middle Sakamena Formation, of northern Madagascar.

References 

Procolophonids
Early Triassic tetrapods of Africa
Triassic Madagascar
Prehistoric animals of Madagascar
Fossil taxa described in 2012
Prehistoric reptile genera